The Presidential Emergency Operations Center (PEOC) is a bunker-like structure underneath the East Wing of the White House. It serves as a secure shelter and communications center for the president of the United States and others in case of an emergency.

History

The first White House bunker was built during World War II to protect President Franklin D. Roosevelt in the event of an aerial attack on Washington. The modern PEOC space has modern communications equipment including televisions and phones to coordinate with outside government entities. During a breach of White House security, including violations of the Washington, D.C. Air Defense Identification Zone (P-56 airspace), the President and other protectees are relocated to the executive briefing room, next to the PEOC. Day to day, the PEOC is staffed around the clock by specialized picked joint-service military officers and non-commissioned officers.

September 11, 2001
During the September 11 attacks, a number of key personnel were evacuated from their offices in the White House to the PEOC. These included Vice President Dick Cheney, First Lady Laura Bush, Lynne Cheney, Condoleezza Rice, Mary Matalin, "Scooter" Libby, Joshua Bolten, Karen Hughes, Stephen Hadley, David Addington, Secret Service agents, U.S. Army major Mike Fenzel serving on a White House Fellowship, and other staff including Norman Mineta. President George W. Bush was visiting a school in Florida at the time of the attacks. Australian Prime Minister 
John Howard was incorrectly reported as being bundled into the PEOC but was actually in a bunker at the Australian Embassy.

May 29, 2020
President Donald Trump retreated to the PEOC during the night of May 29, 2020, at the beginning of the George Floyd protests. After his trip to the bunker was reported in the news, Trump demanded that officials find and prosecute those responsible for the information getting to the press. Trump's Secretary of Defense, Mark Esper, described in his 2022 book that Trump stated the person who leaked his whereabouts "should be executed".

References

External links

Air raid shelters
Continuity of government in the United States
Presidency of the United States
Rooms in the White House
White House
Subterranea of the United States

sv:Vita huset#Östra flygeln